George Maharis (born September 1, 1928) is an American actor who portrayed Buz Murdock in the first three seasons of the TV series Route 66. Maharis also recorded numerous pop music albums at the height of his fame, and later starred in the TV series The Most Deadly Game.

Early years
Maharis was one of seven children born to Greek immigrants in Astoria, Queens. He attended Flushing High School and served in the United States Marine Corps for 18 months.

He studied at the Actors Studio and appeared in off-Broadway productions of Jean Genet's Deathwatch and Edward Albee's The Zoo Story. He appeared on Studio One, Kraft Television Theater, Goodyear Television Playhouse, Stirling Silliphant's Naked City and Otto Preminger's Exodus, and in the soap opera Search for Tomorrow as Bud Gardner, one of Joanne Gardner's relatives who married Janet Bergman Collins.

Route 66
In 1960, Maharis appeared as Buz Murdock in the TV series Route 66, which co-starred Martin Milner.  Maharis was 32 at the time the series started, although the character he was playing was only 23. He received an Emmy nomination in 1962 for his continuing performance as Buz.

Maharis departed without completing his third season of the series, which saw him with health problems, including hepatitis.

Maharis said he left Route 66 for health reasons, because of long hours and grueling conditions while shooting on location. "I have to protect my future", Maharis said in a 1963 interview. "If I keep going at the present pace, I'm a fool. Even if you have $4,000,000 in the bank, you can't buy another liver."

Series producers Stirling Silliphant and Herbert B. Leonard disputed Maharis' stated position, arguing that he desired to break his contract in order to make movies. Maharis biographer Karen Blocher wrote that "the producers felt betrayed and duped when they learned of Maharis's sexual orientation, and never trusted him again," and she speculated "in a less homophobic era, they might have communicated better, and worked things out."  After Maharis' departure, the show's appeal declined. Glenn Corbett acted in the role of Milner's new sidekick, Linc Case. A year later Route 66 was canceled.

Later career

For Maharis, a string of films followed, including Quick, Before It Melts (1964), The Satan Bug and Sylvia (both 1965), A Covenant With Death and The Happening (both 1967), and The Desperados (1969).

Returning to series television in 1970, Maharis starred as criminologist Jonathan Croft in The Most Deadly Game. The series lasted 12 episodes, ending in January 1971.

He modeled fully nude for the July 1973 issue of Playgirl magazine as one of the first celebrities to do so.

Throughout the 1970s and 1980s, Maharis had featured roles in several television movies and also guest-starred on numerous television series, including Mission: Impossible, Fantasy Island, Kojak, McMillan & Wife, Barnaby Jones, Police Story, Switch, Cannon, Night Gallery, and The Bionic Woman, as well as Murder, She Wrote in 1990.

He appeared as Count Machelli, King Cromwell's War Chancellor in The Sword and the Sorcerer (1982). He also starred with the Kenley Players in productions of Barefoot in the Park (1967) and How the Other Half Loves (1973) and in national touring company productions of Company and I Ought to Be in Pictures. In the 1980s, he performed in Las Vegas. Doppelganger (1993) was his last motion picture role.

Filmography

Art and music
Maharis released albums and singles through Epic Records earlier in his career. His only top-40 pop hit was his version of the standard "Teach Me Tonight", which hit number 25 in June 1962, although several other singles charted below the top 40. Later, he performed in nightclubs and pursued a secondary career as an impressionist painter. As of 2008, Maharis was still painting, splitting his time between New York and Beverly Hills.

Selected discography

Albums
Original releases
 1962 – George Maharis Sings! – Epic LN 24001/BN 26001
 1962 – Portrait in Music – Epic LN 24021/BN 26021
 1963 – Just Turn Me Loose! – Epic LN 24037/BN 26037
 1963 – Where Can You Go For a Broken Heart? – Epic LN 24064/BN 26064
 1964 – Make Love to Me – Epic LN 24079/BN 26079
 1964 – Tonight You Belong to Me – Epic LN 24111/BN 26111
 1966 – New Route: George Maharis – Epic LN 24191/BN 26191

Singles
Original releases
 1962 – "After the Lights Go Down Low" / "Teach Me Tonight" – Epic 5-9504
 1962 – "They Knew About You" / "Love Me as I Love You" – Epic 5-9522
 1962 – "I'll Never Smile Again" / "Can't Help Falling In Love" – Epic 5-9545
 1962 – "(Get Your Kicks On) Route 66" / "You Must Have Been A Beautiful Baby" – Epic 3-9548
 1962 – "Baby Has Gone Bye Bye" / "After One Kiss" – Epic 5-9555
 1963 – "Don't Fence Me In" / "Alright, Okay, You Win" – Epic 5-9569
 1963 – "Where Can You Go (For a Broken Heart)" / "Kiss Me" – Epic 5-9600
 1963 – "That's How It Goes" / "It Isn't There" – Epic 5-9613
 1963 – "It's a Sin to Tell a Lie" / "Sara Darling" – Epic 5-9653
 1964 – "Tonight You Belong to Me" / "The Object of My Affection" – Epic 5-9696
 1965 – "I'm Coming Back for You" / "Lonely People Do Foolish Things" – Epic 5-9753
 1965 – "Where Does Happiness Go" / "More I Cannot Do" – Epic 5-9772
 1965 – "You Always Hurt the One You Love" / "Quien Sabe? (Who Knows? Who Knows?)" – Epic 5-9844
 1965 – "A World Without Sunshine" / "Ivy" – Epic 5-9858

Reissues
 "Teach Me Tonight"/"Baby Has Gone Bye Bye" (At least one reissue on Memory Lane)

References

External links

 
 
 
 
 
 

1928 births
Living people
American male film actors
American male stage actors
American male television actors
American people of Greek descent
Epic Records artists
Male actors from New York City
Military personnel from New York City
American male singers
American male models
20th-century American male actors
Playgirl Men of the Month